Konstantinos "Kostas" Karapatis (9 January 1928 – 25 April 2022) was a Greek football player and manager who played as a goalkeeper.

References

1928 births
2022 deaths
Footballers from Thessaloniki
Greek footballers
Association football goalkeepers
Greece international footballers
Greece national football team managers
Iraklis Thessaloniki F.C. players
Olympiacos F.C. players
Greek football managers
Iraklis Thessaloniki F.C. managers
Proodeftiki F.C. managers
Pierikos F.C. managers
Kavala F.C. managers
Panachaiki F.C. managers
Atromitos F.C. managers
P.A.S. Korinthos managers
PAS Giannina F.C. managers
Doxa Drama F.C. managers
Panetolikos F.C. managers
Naoussa F.C. managers